Progestogen-only pills or progestin-only pills (POP) are contraceptive pills that contain only synthetic progestogens (progestins) and do not contain estrogen. They are colloquially known as mini pills.

Although such pills are sometimes called "progesterone-only pills", they do not actually contain progesterone, but one of several chemically related compounds; and there are a number of progestogen-only contraceptive formulations.

Medical uses 
The theoretical efficacy is similar to that of the combined oral contraceptive pill (COCP). However, this pill is taken continuously without any breaks between packets, and traditional progestogen-only pills must be taken to a much stricter time every day (within 3 hours vs. a COCP's 12 hours). However, in some countries, the POP desogestrel (Cerazette) has an approved window of 12 hours. The effectiveness is, therefore, dependent upon compliance.

Lacking the estrogen of combined pills, they are not associated with increased risks of deep vein thrombosis or heart disease. With the decreased clotting risk, they are not contraindicated in the setting of sickle-cell disease. The progestin-only pill is recommended over regular birth control pills for women who are breastfeeding because the mini-pill does not affect milk production (estrogen reduces the amount of breast milk). Like combined pills, the minipill decreases the likelihood of pelvic inflammatory disease.

It is unclear whether POPs provide protection against ovarian cancer to the extent that COCPs do.

There are fewer serious complications than with COCPs.

Available forms

Commercially available progestogen-only pills include the following common or widely used formulations:
 
 Desogestrel 75 µg (e.g., Cerazette)
 Drospirenone 4 mg (e.g., Slynd)
 Norethisterone 350 µg (e.g., Micronor, Nor-QD, Noriday)

And the following rare or mostly discontinued formulations:

 Etynodiol diacetate 500 µg (e.g., Femulen)
 Levonorgestrel 30 µg (e.g., 28 mini, Microval, Norgeston)
 Lynestrenol 500 µg (e.g., Exluton, Mini-kare)
 Norethisterone 300 μg (e.g., Mini-Pe)
 Norgestrel 75 µg (or levonorgestrel 37.5 µg) (e.g., Minicon, Neogest, Ovrette)

As well as the following completely discontinued formulations:

 Chlormadinone acetate 0.5 mg
 Quingestanol acetate 0.3 mg (e.g., Demovis, Pilomin)

In the United States, the only progestogen-only pills that are available are the 350-μg norethisterone and 4-mg drospirenone formulations.

Side effects
 With no break in the dosage, menstrual flow does not initially occur at a predictable time. Most women tend to establish, over a few months, light to heavy spotting at irregular intervals.
 May cause mastalgia (breast tenderness, pain) and mood swings, as well as panic attacks, anxiety and depression.
 Some women may experience abdominal cramps and heavy bleeding.
 May cause weight gain.

Breast cancer risk
Epidemiological evidence on POPs and breast cancer risk is based on much smaller populations of users and so is less conclusive than that for COCPs.

In the largest (1996) reanalysis of previous studies of hormonal contraceptives and breast cancer risk, less than 1% were POP users. Current or recent POP users had a slightly increased relative risk (RR 1.17) of breast cancer diagnosis that just missed being statistically significant. The relative risk was similar to that found for current or recent COCP users (RR 1.16), and, as with COCPs, the increased relative risk decreased over time after stopping, vanished after 10 years, and was consistent with being due to earlier diagnosis or promoting the growth of a preexisting cancer.

The most recent (1999) IARC evaluation of progestogen-only hormonal contraceptives reviewed the 1996 reanalysis as well as 4 case-control studies of POP users included in the reanalysis. They concluded that: "Overall, there was no evidence of an increased risk of breast cancer".

Recent anxieties about the contribution of progestogens to the increased risk of breast cancer associated with HRT in postmenopausal women such as found in the WHI trials have not spread to progestogen-only contraceptive use in premenopausal women.

Depression 
There is a growing body of research investigating the links between hormonal contraception, such as the progestogen-only pill, and potential adverse effects on women’s psychological health. The findings from a large Danish study of one million women (followed-up from January 2000 to December 2013) were published in 2016, and reported that the use of hormonal contraception, particularly amongst adolescents, was associated with a statistically significant increased risk of subsequent depression. The authors found that women on the progestogen-only pill in particular, were 34% more likely to subsequently take anti-depressants or be given a diagnosis of depression, in comparison with those not on hormonal contraception. In 2018, a similarly large nationwide cohort study in Sweden amongst women aged 12–30 (n=815,662) found an association, particularly amongst young adolescents (aged 12–19), between hormonal contraception and subsequent use of psychotropic drugs. Such studies highlight the need for further  research into the influence of hormonal contraception, including the progestogen-only pill on women’s psychological health.

Weight gain
There is some evidence that progestin-only contraceptives may lead to slight weight gain (on average less than 2 kg in the first year) compared to women not using any hormonal contraception.

Mechanism of action
The mechanism of action of progestogen-only contraceptives depends on the progestogen activity and dose.

 Very-low-dose progestogen-only contraceptives, such as traditional progestogen-only pills (and subdermal implants Norplant and Jadelle and intrauterine systems Progestasert and Mirena), inconsistently inhibit ovulation in ~50% of cycles and rely mainly on their progestogenic effect of thickening the cervical mucus, thereby reducing sperm viability and penetration.
 Intermediate-dose progestogen-only contraceptives, such as the progestogen-only pill Cerazette (or the subdermal implant Nexplanon), allow some follicular development (part of the steps of ovulation) but much more consistently inhibit ovulation in 97–99% of cycles. The same cervical mucus changes occur as with very-low-dose progestogens.
 High-dose progestogen-only contraceptives, such as the injectables Depo-Provera and Noristerat, completely inhibit follicular development and ovulation. The same cervical mucus changes occur as with very-low-dose and intermediate-dose progestogens.

In anovulatory cycles using progestogen-only contraceptives, the endometrium is thin and atrophic. If the endometrium were also thin and atrophic during an ovulatory cycle, this could, in theory, interfere with implantation of a blastocyst (embryo).

History
The first POP to be introduced contained 0.5 mg chlormadinone acetate and was marketed in Mexico and France in 1968. However, it was withdrawn in 1970 due to safety concerns pertaining to long-term animal toxicity studies. Subsequently, levonorgestrel 30 µg (brand name Microval) was marketed in Germany in 1971. It was followed by a number of other POPs shortly thereafter in the early 1970s, including etynodiol diacetate, lynestrenol, norethisterone, norgestrel, and quingestanol acetate. Desogestrel 75 µg (brand name Cerzette) was marketed in Europe in 2002 and was the most recent POP to be introduced. It differs from earlier POPs in that it is able to inhibit ovulation in 97% of cycles.

See also
 Progestogen-only injectable contraceptive
 Oral contraceptive formulations

References

Hormonal contraception
Progestogens